The Nantucket was a sidewheel steamer operating as a ferry serving the islands of Martha's Vineyard and Nantucket during the end of the nineteenth century and the beginning of the twentieth century. On the Vineyard it docked at Cottage City (later Oak Bluffs, Massachusetts), Vineyard Haven, and the West Chop Wharf.

The Nantucket, a 629-ton vessel, was built in 1886 in Wilmington, Delaware for service with the New Bedford, Martha's Vineyard, and Nantucket Steamboat Co. fleet, later reorganized as the Steamship Authority.

According to a 1961 Vineyard Gazette article, the Nantucket "had decorated paddleboxes that made large, rhythmic and beautiful half-circles on the sides."

Nantucket measured 190 feet long with a beam of 33 feet. It was copper fastened, and its double frame made of oak, hackmatack and cedar. Its hull had three watertight bulkheads, and drew four-and-a-half feet of water.

A new ferry, the MV Nantucket, was built in 1974 and named after this old sidewheeler.

Notes

References 

 Banks, Charles E., The History of Martha's Vineyard, Mass., Volume I. (Dukes County Historical Society, 1911)
  - reprint of a 1980 article in the Vineyard Gazette
  - reprint of a 1961 article in the Vineyard Gazette

Paddle steamers
Ferries of Massachusetts
History of Massachusetts
Maritime history of the United States
Martha's Vineyard
Ships built in Wilmington, Delaware
Steamboats of Nantucket Sound
Transportation in Dukes County, Massachusetts
Transportation in Nantucket, Massachusetts